The Cycling Union of Finland or SPU is the national governing body of cycle racing in Finland.

The SPU is a member of the UCI and the UEC.

External links
 Cycling Union of Finland official website

Finland
Cycle racing organizations
Sports governing bodies in Finland
Cycle racing in Finland